Xestia ornata is a moth of the family Noctuidae. It is found from the northern Tien-Shan Mountains through the Pamirs and Hissar-Darwaz system to eastern Afghanistan (Nuristan).

The wingspan is 32–37 mm.

External links
A Revision of the Palaearctic species of the Eugraphe (Hübner, 1821-1816) Generic complex. Parti. The genera Eugraphe and Goniographa (Lepidoptera, Noctuidae)

ornata
Moths of Asia